Cross Creek is a  long 4th order tributary to the Cape Fear River in Cumberland County, North Carolina.

Variant names
According to the Geographic Names Information System, it has also been known historically as: 
Crosscreek
Fayetteville

Course
Cross Creek rises on the west side of Fayetteville, North Carolina in Fort Bragg. Cross Creek then flows southeast through Fayetteville to join the Cape Fear River on the east side of Fayetteville.

Watershed
Cross Creek drains  of area, receives about 47.2 in/year of precipitation, has a wetness index of 489.33 and is about 20% forested.

See also
List of rivers of North Carolina

References

Rivers of North Carolina
Rivers of Cumberland County, North Carolina
Tributaries of the Cape Fear River